Maurice Paul René Monney-Bouton (24 February 1892 in Paris – 15 June 1965) was a French rower who competed in the 1920 Summer Olympics and in the 1924 Summer Olympics.

In 1920 he won the silver medal as member of the French boat in the coxed pair event. Four years later he won his second silver medal this time with his partner Georges Piot in the coxless pair event.

References

External links
 profile

1892 births
1965 deaths
Rowers from Paris
French male rowers
Olympic rowers of France
Olympic silver medalists for France
Rowers at the 1920 Summer Olympics
Rowers at the 1924 Summer Olympics
Olympic medalists in rowing
Medalists at the 1924 Summer Olympics
Medalists at the 1920 Summer Olympics
European Rowing Championships medalists
20th-century French people